Abdul Gani is a Bangladesh Nationalist Party politician and the former Member of Parliament of Meherpur-2.

Career
Gani was elected to parliament from Meherpur-2 as a Bangladesh Nationalist Party candidate in 2001.

References

Bangladesh Nationalist Party politicians
Living people
8th Jatiya Sangsad members
5th Jatiya Sangsad members
People from Meherpur District
6th Jatiya Sangsad members
Year of birth missing (living people)